Zrinko Ogresta (born 5 October 1958) is a Croatian screenwriter and film director, professor of film directing at the Academy of Dramatic Arts in Zagreb and a member of the European Film Academy in Berlin. Praised for their strong visual style, well articulated mise-en-scène and innovative storytelling, his films focus on the anxieties that lurk behind the well cultivated burgeois facade of the characters, using their emotional and psychological fractures to bring to light the complexes that haunt the society in general, while subtly analysing social and political forces behind it.

Ogresta's films were screened and awarded at renowned international and local festivals (Berlin, Venice, Karlovy Vary, London, Montpellier, Denver, Milan, Pula…). Some of the most notable prizes are the nomination for European Film Award in the category of best young director for the film Fragments, Prix Italia for the film Washed Out, the Special Jury Prize at the Karlovy Vary festival for the film Here and a Special Mention at the Berlinale for the film On the other side.

Filmography
1991 – Fragments: Chronicle of a Vanishing; writer and director
1995 – Washed Out (Isprani); writer and director
1999 – Red Dust (Crvena prašina); director
2003 – Here (Tu); writer and director
2008 – Behind the Glass (Iza stakla); co-writer and director
2013 – Projections (Projekcije); director
2016 – On the Other Side (S one strane); writer and director
2021 – A Blue Flower (Plavi cvijet); director

References

External links  

Croatian film directors
Living people
1958 births
People from Virovitica
Vladimir Nazor Award winners
Golden Arena for Best Director winners